The Iya Valley (祖谷 Iya) region in Tokushima Prefecture, Japan is a scenic area known for its dramatic mountain valleys, thatched roof farmhouses and historic vine bridges. Although access has improved in recent years, the Iya Valley and the inner parts of Shikoku have historically been remote and difficult to enter, making them a favorite retreat for refugees and defeated warriors. Most notably, members of the Taira clan (aka Heike clan) were rumored to have entered the area after losing the Genpei War to the Minamoto clan in the late 12th century.

In modern times, the Iya Valley has become an increasingly popular tourist destination due to its natural environment and to being one of the last few vestiges of old world Japan. Although the west part of the valley (known as Nishi-Iya) has good road access and other tourist facilities, the eastern area known as Higashi-Iya (東祖谷) or Oku-Iya (奥祖谷) is still relatively difficult to access. Several vine bridges, once the only method for crossing the rivers, continue to span the valleys and have become a tourist attraction.

Etymology 

The name of Iya has somewhat cloudy origins. According to noted Japanese historical researcher Kunio Yanagita, the term "Iya" (イヤ) or "Oya" (オヤ) has been used since times immemorial to denote this mountainous valley region. This term is believed to translate as "ancestor" or "mountain/land spirit" (in the sense that according to Japanese tradition, one's ancestral spirits dwell in mountains), but since it is a phonetic term and predates the introduction of Chinese characters, it is difficult to say for certain.

Yanagita further believes that with the introduction of Chinese characters, the kanji characters 祖谷 ("Iya"), which translates as "ancestor valley", were chosen due to matching in both meaning and in phonetics.

History

The sheer remoteness of the Iya Valley made it a popular hideout for samurai warriors and refugees over the centuries. The most infamous inhabitants of the area were members of the Taira clan, who were believed to have sought refuge in the valley after facing defeat in the Genpei War (1180-1185) to the Minamoto clan, who went on to found the Kamakura Shogunate in the late 12th century. Iya has a number of vine bridges, which were created by the Taira and can be found in parts of the valley.

Geography 

Although there are several rivers that flow through the Iya Valley region, the Iya River (祖谷川 Iya-gawa) is the principal one, flowing from east to west and forming the entirety of the Iya Valley. Mount Tsurugi (剣山 Tsurugi-san), the second-highest peak on Shikoku island, is at the east end of the Iya Valley along the border with Tsurugi town, and from here the headwaters of the Iya River begin their flow from springs that come off the mountain, some of which are as high as 1800m. The Iya Valley follows this river for about 50 km, to the village of Iyaguchi (祖谷口) in Yamashiro District of Miyoshi City, where the Iya River joins the Yoshino River at an elevation of  about 90m.

The Iya Valley was formerly divided into two villages East Iya (東祖谷山村) and West Iya (西祖谷山村), however, on March 1, 2006, both villages merged with other local towns to form Miyoshi City. However the two former villages are still referred to by their old names locally, "Nishi-Iya" (West Iya) and "Higashi-Iya" (East Iya).

The lower reaches of the Iya Valley are referred to as the Iya Gorge (祖谷渓 Iya-kei). This area is mostly undeveloped and unpopulated, but the original road that accesses the Iya Valley goes through here (Rt 32), which was built between 1902 and 1920. Though a more modern tunnel connecting the central valley to Oboke has been built (allowing faster and easier access to the main areas of the Iya Valley), it is still possible to enter by way of the old, mostly one-laned road through the gorge (called the "Iya Highway"). About halfway along this 20 km long cliffside, gorge road is the Peeing Boy Statue , which was installed in 1968 in honor of young boys who would traditionally relieve themselves from this high precipice.

Culture 
As the valley has been historically isolated from the surrounding areas, it has developed its own unique heritage. Many of the traditions are still (just barely) alive, harking back to a time and style now largely lost elsewhere in Japan.

Food 
Agriculture
The traditional culinary offerings in the valley are based on what can be grown in the small terraced farm plots that climb up the hillsides through the valley's hamlets. Very few mechanized tools are used, though some people have small hand-pushed tilling machines. Nearly all crops are organically grown, with the main fertilizer being the susuki grass (also called kaya) that is also used for roof thatch. This grass is harvested in the mid-autumn and bundled into small pyramids around the fields so that it can be used in the spring.

Grains and Vegetables

Various vegetables are still produced for local consumption or for use in the valley's inns. In the past rice was grown but was difficult to cultivate in abundance, so the main staples are soba (buckwheat) and potatoes. The soba is either prepared as a whole-grain porridge (soba-gome) or as noodles. To this day noodles are still grounded by hand in traditional stone mortars in some households, and several people in the valley offer classes.
The famed Iya potatoes are small and dense due to the rough and rocky soil conditions. Usually served roasted or in soups, a local dish consists of whole boiled potatoes mixed with miso paste and garlic.

Other foods include the locally produced tofu, which is rather unusual for Japan, and called ishi-dofu or iwa-dofu by the locals, which literally means "stone tofu". It gets its name from its thick density, so stiff that a brick sized piece would be traditionally carried by a single rope wrapped around it. This is prepared in soups, roasted over charcoal with miso paste, or served uncooked with ground ginger, green onions, and soy sauce.
Konnyaku is another locally produced delicacy, which is a rubbery gelatin produced from a Japanese yam. Renowned for its medicinal and health qualities, it is served in soups, roasted, or uncooked with miso paste.

A common treat is called dekomawashi which consists of a whole Iya potato, a square of iwadofu, and a wedge of konnyaku all skewered together on a bamboo stick, then slathered with miso and slowly roasted over coals. This can be found at roadside shops and most hotels and restaurants.

Various types of wild mountain sprouts collectively known throughout Japan as san-sai (mountain vegetables) are a garnish for soups and noodle dishes and are a rather sought after delicacy in the Iya Valley as such mountainous terrain is where they tend to randomly grow. However, like elsewhere in the country, due to the expense and difficulty in producing, it is probably more common at most local restaurants and hotels to be (unknowingly) served cheaper imported san-sai, usually from China. However, local people do produce san-sai for their own use, and if staying at a small inn or homestay you would probably have an opportunity to sample the real thing.

Meat

In the past farm animals were standard but nowadays (at best) one may find the occasional chicken or two.

Hunting and fishing were once common, but are now less so. Wild boar and deer are still prized and the few hunters/trappers around can now sell their finds through the new (opened in 2014) hunters' butchery located in Higashi Iya. As a result, such wild game is becoming available in some local restaurants and hotels. Traditionally however, the local hunters would have huts deep in the mountains (only a dozen or so remain active) where their kills would be brought and butchered, the hunting dogs would be fed, and a feast of meat would be grilled up and shared. As the meat was so fresh, it was common for the prime cuts to be eaten raw.

River trout (amego) is a popular delicacy and though still fished by some, it is more commonly gotten by the few local hatcheries. To prepare, usually the whole fish is encrusted in salt, skewered with a bamboo stick, and then roasted slowly over charcoal.

The amego fish is also a main ingredient in hirara-yaki, which is an offering unique to the Iya Valley. This meal is traditionally slow-cooked on a large stone with a fire beneath, but nowadays it is more common to have it prepared on a large iron griddle. To prepare, thick walls of miso paste (both red and white miso) are formed in a circle around the edges, and inside a collection of fish, potatoes, tofu, onions, and konnyaku are cooked in a sake based broth which steeps in the surrounding miso. While usually only (and rarely) prepared at festivals or special occasions, it is possible to find it on the menu in individual portions at some inns and hotels.

Drink 
Iya people love to drink; however, there is no local alcohol (legally) produced. While beer is common, the oldest generation still prefers sake, while the middle-aged men are more partial to shochu.

The Iya drinking etiquette is usually practiced at shrine festivals, home parties, and banquets. In this drinking style, a person has his own small cup from which he must first consume a cupful in order to 'break it in'. Then he passes his cup to his neighbor and pours him a cupful (usually sake, but any alcohol or even non-alcohol is allowable). The receiving person must immediately drink this, so that he can return the cup. The cup is then filled for the original owner, and he must drink this cup quickly because he will then be given the cup owned by the person he just gave his to. This sharing and serving of cups will go on back and forth between two people for as long as their conversation continues, and then they both move on to other people in the room. It is proper to share at least one cupful with every person present at the occasion, which could take a rather long time and result in heavy intoxication at large gatherings.

It is still common for local people to grow and roast their own tea, called bancha (番茶), and is primarily used for household consumption. Each spring the youngest leaves are picked, roasted, pressed by hand, and dried in the sun on straw mats laid out in front of homes. When visiting a home, it is common to be served this either hot or lukewarm.

Festivals 
Several festivals of various size are held throughout the year.

Most local Shinto shrines host their own festivals for the surrounding neighborhood, usually once or twice a year according to their own traditions. In these events, local customs often call for a group of men to carry a small (70–150 kg) portable shrine around the shrine grounds while accompanied with drummers, people in costume, and sometimes pairs of people throwing long bamboo staffs. Each shrine and neighborhood has its own customs (one or two even have the attendees engage in sumo), but due to an ever-dwindling population, many of these traditions are being lost.

The largest festivals in the valley are the summer festivals, one each in Nishi-Iya and Higashi-Iya. They are held at the middle-school grounds on the weekends before and after the national Obon Holiday (August 15) as this is a common time for family members who have moved away to return home for a visit. These events are open to anyone and include food tents, games, performances, and fireworks, so if visiting the area at this time, ask around or look for promotional posters.

The Yukigassen (Snowball Fight Competition) is held each January in Higashi Iya, and has become a major event at a time when few visit the valley. Not simply a free-for-all, this event is team-based and participants often practice for months to coordinate their skills in the tightly ruled sport. There are several classes of participation including children, women's, men's, and 'just for fun' leagues, and the winners of the main event get to advance to the national competition annually held in Nagano Prefecture.

Architecture 
The original Iya hamlets extend up the valley walls in clusters and only in the past forty years or so have roads been built connecting them to the main roadway at the base of the valley, with many hamlets only getting roads as recently as the 1990s. Many homes sit abandoned.

The traditional home building style in the Iya valley is called kayabuki ( 茅葺 thatched roof house, also called minka 民家) and many examples of these buildings still exist, though those with exposed thatch are now usually used as inns, restaurants, or historic sites and not for personal use. Since cutting, bundling and replacing the thatch is a time-consuming and costly endeavor, most personal homes which still have thatch now have it covered over with corrugated tin panels to prevent it from rotting. Though the thatch isn't visible, it is easy to spot these homes on the hillsides as they have thick, high-pitched roofs. Since the 1950s or so many of the thatched homes have had their roof pitch lowered and the roof completely replaced with either tiles or corrugated tin.

Historically, it was common for a home site to consist of three buildings: the main home, a barn, and what is locally called an inkyo (隠居) "retirement home" which would be a smaller but independently functioning house for the family's oldest generation. As one set of grandparents died, the next would move into this separate house for some most likely much sought after peace and quiet.

The most modern homes from the 1960s onwards lie along the main valley roadside and are often built on heavy steel scaffolds due to the lack of flat space.

The frames of the traditional homes are made with massive, interwoven red pine (akamatsu 赤松) or southern Japanese hemlock (tsuga 栂) logs for horizontal beams and squared-off chestnut (kuri 栗) for vertical beams. All are connected through traditional craftsmanship without nails, allowing the wood to expand and contract with the seasons. Some of the oldest building examples still standing date back to the seventeenth century. The foundations are usually made entirely of chestnut beams due to its high strength and anti-rotting properties, and the base beams simply sit upon stone piles such that nothing is actually secured to the ground (that is, no concrete or planting of beams).

Inside, the center point of the home is the approximately one meter square irori (囲炉裏 sunken floor hearth) which would usually stay alight with low embers at all times. To maintain the burn, four chestnut logs would be placed inward at each corner and a small, flameless charcoal fire within the joining point at the center would slowly burn on the tips of the logs, and as the logs burned out they would be pushed slightly more into the center. The irori would be used for cooking, either with an iron pot stand or with the suspended jizai-kagi (自在鈎) which consists of an adjustable hook connected to a ceiling beam above and from which a pot could be hung, with the height adjusted according to the temperature sought. Often the jizai-kagi would be made of a bamboo pole with a carved wooden fish used for the hook adjusting mechanism (with the fish serving as a water talisman to ward off the danger of fire).

As the fire would constantly burn, and since there are no chimneys, the ceilings and beams in these homes have now become blackened with soot, particularly the higher in the house they are. The internal bamboo lattice to which the roof thatch would be lashed to would accordingly turn a deep red-brown when polished (called susutake 煤竹), and it was sought after by handicraft workers whenever a roof was replaced. One of the main reasons to have such a smokey atmosphere was to help dry out the roof thatch from the inside and extend its lifespan (usually about 25 or 30 years). However the smoke-filled homes did serve an additional purpose, which was to help cure the tobacco leaves that would be hung from the rafters during the winter (until the 1970s, tobacco was the primary cash-crop in the valley. Currently it is no longer grown anywhere in Iya).

Also standard in the homes is the storage cellar, located under a removable pair of floor boards. This cellar would be dug about one meter deep into the ground and would be used to store potatoes, pickles and other foods as the temperature would be cooler and more consistent down there in the summer.

The best known historical houses of East Iya are:

Asa-ke House 阿佐家住宅.  Located in the hamlet of Asa 阿佐, this is one of the largest houses in Iya, formerly lived in by the leader of the descendants of the Heike warriors who fled into Iya in the late 12th century. The present house dates from 1862, and was fully restored in 1917.

Kita-ke House 喜多家住宅.  Located in the hamlet of Oeda 大枝, this was formerly a samurai residence, like Asa-ke a very large house for Iya. It was built in Horeki 13 宝暦13, which corresponds to 1763. It was moved to its present location and fully restored in 1990.</ref> https://www.youtube.com/watch?v=cwu_wbrvuJQ</ref>

Kimura-ke House 木村家住宅. Located in the hamlet of Tsurui 釣井, this is oldest house in Iya, dated to Genroku 12 元禄12, which corresponds to 1699. In 1976 it was declared an Important Cultural Property 重要文化財, and it was fully restored in 1984.

Chiiori 篪庵. "Sister house" to Kimura-ke, just up the hill in Tsurui hamlet. It's believed to have been built around the same time or soon after Kimura-ke in the Genroku Era 元禄時代 (1688-1704). Bought by writer Alex Kerr in 1973, it has been the center first of a volunteer movement, and since the 2000s, NPO "Chiiori Trust" and company "Chiiori Alliance" dedicated to rural revival in Iya and elsewhere in Japan. The house was fully restored in 2012.

Houses in Ochiai Hamlet 落合集落.  Ochiai hamlet, perched on a steep hillside, includes numerous old houses dating from the 18th to the early 20th centuries. In 2005 the hamlet was designated by the national government as a Juyo Dentoteki Kenzobutsugun 重要伝統的建造物群, (abbreviated to Judenken 重伝建),  "Important Group of Traditional Structures." From 2012 to 2016, the City of Miyoshi, to which Iya belongs, restored eight houses, re-thatching the roofs, and installing modern comforts. The planning and design were done by Alex Kerr and the Chiiori staff. The  houses are now managed for the city by Chiiori Alliance as "Tougenkyo Iya" 桃源郷祖谷 ("Shangrila Iya")

Vine bridges 

The Iya Valley is famed for its unique vine bridges (called "kazurabashi") that hang over the Iya River. Each is made from several tons of Wisteria floribunda vines that are gathered from the surrounding mountains. At one point in the past there were 13 of these bridges in the valley, but now only 3 remain: the main Iya-no-Kazurabashi in Nishi-Iya, and the Oku-Iya Double Vine Bridges ("Oku-Iya Niju Kazurabashi") located at the furthest end of Higashi-Iya near the base of Mt Tsurugi. The main Iya-no-Kazurabashi is 45 meters in length and is classified in Japan as an Important Tangible Folk Culture Property. Its vines are replaced every 3 years, and for safety, steel cables are laced inside the vines.

Tourism 
Tourism is quite popular in the western part of the valley (Nishi-Iya) particularly due to the historic vine bridge (kazurabashi) and hot spring baths at the large hotels in its vicinity. Yet most people (about 95%) do not get much farther than this site, mainly due to the fact that the primary access road to the rest of the valley is only one lane at times which creates insurance restrictions for most group tour buses.

However, the deeper reaches of the valley in Higashi Iya are much more preserved. For those visiting in the summer months, the pleasant temperatures are an escape from the usually oppressive heat found most other places in the country. Aside from the scenic double vine bridge deep in the valley (Oku-Iya Kazurabashi), there are historic hamlets, many thatched-roof homes, extensive mountain hiking, and one of the oddest art installations in the country.

Notes

External links

 IyaTime: Iya Valley Tourism Website in English 
 http://atlasobscura.com/places/vine-bridges-japan
 The alluring lofty peaks of Iya Valley (The Japan Times)
 Vine bridges cross Japan's remote Iya Valley (The Philadelphia Inquirer)
 Few Americans know about this mysterious, remote valley in southern Japan (The Washington Post)
 Off the Beaten Track on the Island of Shikoku  (Channel NewsAsia)
 In between days in Okayama, Japan (The Australian Financial Review)
  (Chiiori Trust)
 (Chiiori Org)
 (Inside Kyoto)
 (Huffington Post Japan)
 (New York Times)
 (Travel Age West)

Regions of Japan
Landforms of Tokushima Prefecture
Tourist attractions in Tokushima Prefecture
Valleys of Japan
Miyoshi, Tokushima